Emmanuel Saban Laryea (born 12 December 1995) is a Ghanaian professional footballer. As of 2019, he plays for Ococias Kyoto AC.

Career
Laryea began his career at Dragon FC in 2008. He joined Aurorus (Hearts of Oak Junior) in 2010, where he later joined the senior team Hearts of Oak in 2012.

Dire Dawa City
In late 2017, Laryea signed for Ethiopian Premier League club Dire Dawa City S.C.

Ococias Kyoto AC
Laryea joined Japanese club Ococias Kyoto AC in February 2019.

International
Saban played his two games for the Ghana national football team in 2015 African Nations Championship qualification.

References

External links 
 
 
 Sports FR Profile
 Profile at Scoresok website

Living people
1995 births
Association football midfielders
Footballers from Accra
Ghanaian footballers
Ghana international footballers
Accra Hearts of Oak S.C. players